is a town located in Takaoka District, Kōchi Prefecture, Japan.

Geography 
Ochi is located in  midwestern  Kōchi Prefecture on the island of Shikoku.The western part of the town lies the Yokokurayama Prefectural Natural Park. The center of the town is located at the confluence of three rivers, the Niyodo River, the Sakaori River, and the Yanase River, and is lined with houses and shops. The Ikazu Dam is located in Ochi.

Neighbouring municipalities 
Kōchi Prefecture
 Ino
  Niyodogawa
 Sakawa
  Tsuno
 Hidaka

Climate
Ochi has a Humid subtropical climate (Köppen Cfa) characterized by warm summers and cool winters with light snowfall.  The average annual temperature in Ochi is 15.3 °C. The average annual rainfall is 2688 mm with September as the wettest month. The temperatures are highest on average in January, at around 25.6 °C, and lowest in January, at around 5.0 °C.

Demographics
Per Japanese census data, the population of Ochi has been decreased steadily since the 1960s.

History 
As with all of Kōchi Prefecture, the area of Ochi was part of ancient Tosa Province. There is a local legend that Emperor Antoku escaped the disaster at the Battle of Dannoura during the Genpei War, and lived the rest of his life in obscurity in this area. During the Edo period, the area was part of the holdings of Tosa Domain ruled by the Yamauchi clan from their seat at Kōchi Castle. The village of Ochi was established with the creation of the modern municipalities system on October 1, 1889. It was raised to town status on June 7, 1900.

Government
Ochi has a mayor-council form of government with a directly elected mayor and a unicameral town council of ten members. Ochi, together with the municipalities of Sakawa and Hidaka, contributes one member to the Kōchi Prefectural Assembly. In terms of national politics, the town is part of Kōchi 2nd district of the lower house of the Diet of Japan.

Economy
The economy of Ochi is almost entirely agricultural.

Education
Ochi has one public elementary school and one public middle school operated by the village government. The town does not have a high school.

Transportation

Railway
The town does not have any passenger railroad service. The nearest train station is Sakawa Station on the JR Shikoku Dosan Line in the neighboring town of Sakawa.

Highways

Noted people from Ochi
Futago Kamikita, manga artist
Yūji Yamamoto, politician

References

External links

 Ochi official website 

Towns in Kōchi Prefecture